Liu Xiaoting is a ski-orienteering competitor from China. She won two medals at the 2011 Asian Winter Games, including a silver medal in the sprint behind Olga Novikova, and a bronze medal in the middle distance, behind Novikova and Yevgeniya Kuzmina.

References

Year of birth missing (living people)
Living people
Chinese female cross-country skiers
Chinese orienteers
Female orienteers
Ski-orienteers
Asian Games medalists in ski orienteering
Ski-orienteers at the 2011 Asian Winter Games
Asian Games silver medalists for China
Asian Games bronze medalists for China

Medalists at the 2011 Asian Winter Games